Krzyżówki may refer to the following places:
Krzyżówki, Greater Poland Voivodeship (west-central Poland)
Krzyżówki, Kuyavian-Pomeranian Voivodeship (north-central Poland)
Krzyżówki, Łódź Voivodeship (central Poland)
Krzyżówki, Silesian Voivodeship (south Poland)